Tillandsia × rectifolia is a natural hybrid of T. schiedeana and T. ionantha. This plant is native to Costa Rica and Mexico.

References

rectifolia
Plant nothospecies
Flora of Costa Rica
Flora of Mexico